Information economy is an economy with an increased emphasis on informational activities and information industry, where information is valued as a capital good. The term was coined by Marc Porat, a graduate student at Stanford University, who would later co-found General Magic.

Manuel Castells states that information economy is not mutually exclusive with manufacturing economy.  He finds that some countries such as Germany and Japan exhibit the informatization of manufacturing processes. In a typical conceptualization, however, information economy is considered a "stage" or "phase" of an economy, coming after stages of hunting, agriculture, and manufacturing. This conceptualization can be widely observed regarding information society, a closely related but wider concept.

There are numerous characterizations of the transformations some  economies have undergone. Service economy, high-tech economy, late-capitalism, post-Fordism, and global economy are among the most frequently used terms, having some overlaps and contradictions among themselves. Closer terms to information economy would include knowledge economy.

See also

 Capitalism
 Creative industry
 Digital economy
 Electronic business
 Electronic commerce
 Information superhighway
 Information market
 Information revolution
 Information society
 Intellectual property
 Knowledge economy
 Knowledge market
 Knowledge policy
 Network economics
 Online advertising
 Platform capitalism
 Surveillance capitalism
 Virtual economy

Also, see The Effective Executive by Peter Drucker (1966); Drucker describes the manual worker (page 2) who works with his hands and produces "stuff". The knowledge worker (page 3) works with his head and produces ideas, knowledge, and information.

Further reading 
 Boyett, Joseph H. And Jimmie T. Boyett. 2001. The Guru Guide to the Knowledge Economy. John Wiley& Sons. John Wiley & Sons
 Coyle, Diane. 1997. The Weightless World. MIT Press.
 Evans, Philip B. and Thomas S. Wurster. 2000. Blown to Bits. Harvard Business School Press.
 Mcgee, James and Lawrence Prusak. 1993. Managing Information Strategically. Random House
 Negroponte, Nicholas. 1996. Being Digital.
 Rayport, Jeffrey F. and John J. Sviokla. 1995. Exploiting the Virtual Value Chain. in: Harvard Business Review (no. 1995)
 Rifkin, Jeremy. 2000. The Age of Access. Penguin Putnam.
 Schwartz, Evan I. 1999. Digital Darwinism. Broadway Books.
 Shapiro, Carl and Hal R. Varian. 1999. Information Rules: A Strategic Guide to the Network Economy. Harvard Business School Press.
 Tapscott, Donald. 1996. The Digital Economy. McGraw-Hill.

References

External links

 
Information society